Patrik Brydolf (born 27 November 1991) is a Swedish tennis player.

Brydolf has a career high ATP singles ranking of 523 achieved on 15 August 2011. He also has a career high ATP doubles ranking of 348 achieved on 12 September 2011.

Brydolf made his ATP main draw debut at the 2008 If Stockholm Open in the doubles draw partnering Daniel Berta.

ITF Futures titles

Doubles: 4

References

External links

1991 births
Living people
Swedish male tennis players
Tennis players from Stockholm
21st-century Swedish people